Järvinen is Finnish surname meaning "small lake". It is the tenth most common Finnish surname. Notable people with the surname include:

Akilles Järvinen (1905–1943), Finnish athlete and decathlete
Albert Järvinen (1950–1991), Finnish guitarist
Esko Järvinen (1907–1976), Finnish Nordic combined skier
Heli Järvinen (born 1963), Finnish politician
Juhani Järvinen (1935–1984), Finnish speed skater
Kirk Jarvinen (born 1967), American illustrator and comic-book artist
Kristian Järvinen (born 1992), Finnish ice hockey player
Matti Järvinen (1909–1985), Finnish javelin thrower
Petri Järvinen (born 1965), Finnish football player
Toni Järvinen (born 1981), Finnish football (soccer) player
Verner Järvinen (1870–1941), Finnish discus thrower

See also
Matti Järvinen (disambiguation)

References

Finnish-language surnames